Voodoo DJ Soul Essentials is an EP by R&B and neo soul musician D'Angelo, released in 2000 on Virgin Records. As part of the promotional efforts by the Cheeba Sound label and Virgin Records America for D'Angelo's second studio album Voodoo, the 12" vinyl EP was issued in order to attract DJs and airplay. Voodoo DJ Soul Essentials consists of three tracks taken off of the Voodoo album "Chicken Grease", "Feel Like Makin' Love", and "Spanish Joint" in their original versions (on the A-side), as well as instrumental versions (on the B-side). The cover art for the album was originally featured in the Voodoo album liner notes.

Track listing

Side one
"Chicken Grease" – 4:38
"Feel Like Makin' Love" – 6:22
"Spanish Joint" – 5:44

Side two
"Chicken Grease (Instrumental)" – 4:35
"Feel Like Makin' Love (Instrumental)" – 6:09
"Spanish Joint (Instrumental)" – 5:44

Notes

References

D'Angelo albums
Albums recorded at Electric Lady Studios
2000 remix albums
Virgin Records remix albums
2000 EPs
Virgin Records EPs